The 2015 SAFF Championship (officially known as the SAFF Suzuki Cup 2015 for sponsorship reasons) was the 11th edition of the SAFF Championship, the biennial international men's football championship of South Asia organized by SAFF. It was held in India from 23 December 2015 to 3 January 2016.

Heading into the tournament, Afghanistan were the defending champions of the tournament, with it also being the last time they can officially take part, as they have become members of the newly formed Central Asian Football Association.

Originally scheduled to take place in July 2015, monsoon season and schedule congestion led to the tournament being postponed to late December. The tournament saw no participation from Pakistan, who withdrew from the tournament in November 2015 due a dispute within the nation's football federation.

India was chosen as the host nation on 10 September 2013 with the host venue to be decided between Delhi and Kerala. In July 2015, it was announced that matches during the tournament would be held at the Trivandrum International Stadium in Thiruvananthapuram, Kerala. This is the third time in which India has hosted the tournament, when it was known as the Gold Cup in 1999 and under the current name in 2011.

Participating nations
Apart from hosts India, six other South Asian nations participated in the tournament, with Pakistan being the only nation not participating. There was no reason cited by the PFF but issues with the federation's elections have forced the courts to prohibit any activities.

Venue
On 2 July 2015, it was announced that the matches during the tournament would take place at the newly constructed Greenfield Stadium in Thiruvananthapuram, Kerala.

Squads

Broadcasting
The tournament was broadcast live in India on STAR Sports 4 , Kantipur Television Network in Nepal, Lemar TV and Tolo TV in Afghanistan. Gazi TV  in Bangladesh, Bhutan Broadcasting Service in Bhutan and Television Maldives in Maldives. Every match was broadcast live on YouTube.

Group stage
All times are local, IST (UTC+5:30).

Group A

Group B

Knockout phase

Bracket

Semi-finals

Final

Champion

Awards
The following awards were given for the 2015 SAFF Championship.

Goalscorers
 4 goals
  Khaibar Amani
 3 goals
  Faysal Shayesteh
  Jeje Lalpekhlua
  Sunil Chhetri
 2 goals

  Masih Saighani
  Omid Popalzay
  Ahmad Hatifi
  Shakhawat Hossain Rony
  Lallianzuala Chhangte
  Robin Singh
  Ali Ashfaq
  Ahmed Nashid

 1 goal

  Zubayr Amiri
  Sayed Mohammad Hashemi
  Kanischka Taher
  Hemanta Vincent Biswas
  Topu Barman
  Tshering Dorji
  Rowllin Borges
  Bimal Magar
  Ahmed Imaz
  Asadhulla Abdulla
  Amdhan Ali
  Naiz Hassan
  Mohamed Rifnas

Team statistics 
This table shows all team performance.

Source: SAFF

Controversies
During the first match of the tournament, both Sri Lanka and Nepal were wearing the same dark red jersey in the first half before Nepal changed into their blue second-kit for the second half.

Sponsorship
On 14 September 2015 it was announced that Suzuki would be the title sponsor of the SAFF Championship for 2015.

References

External links
 Official Site

2015 SAFF Championship
2015 in Asian football
2015–16 in Indian football
SAFF Championship
International association football competitions hosted by India